Aspergillus sulphureus is a species of fungus belonging to the family Aspergillaceae.

References

sulphureus